Gharti is a surname found in Nepal. It belongs to Khas, Bhujel and Magar ethnicities. Notable people with the name include:

 Balaram Gharti Magar, former Defense Minister of Nepal
 Bimal Gharti Magar, Nepalese football player
 Chandra Prakash Gharti, Nepalese politician
 Jaypuri Gharti, Nepalese politician
 Onsari Gharti Magar, the first female speaker of Parliament of Nepal

Nepali-language surnames